Dunkaroos are a snack food from Betty Crocker, first launched in 1990. It consists of a snack-sized package containing cookies and frosting; as the name implies, the cookies are meant to be dunked into the frosting before eating. Individual snack packages contain about ten small cookies and one cubic inch of frosting. The cookies are made in a variety of shapes, including a circle with an uppercase "D" in the center (the only shape featured in the 2020 version), feet, the mascot in different poses, and a hot air balloon.

Marketing 
The Dunkaroos mascot is a cartoon kangaroo, explaining the product's name which is a portmanteau of dunk and kangaroos. The original mascot was Sydney, a caricature of modern Australian culture, who wore a hat, vest, and tie and spoke with an Australian accent, and was voiced by John Cameron Mitchell. At the height of their popularity in 1996, a contest known as "Dunk-a-roos Kangaroo Kanga-Who Search" was held, resulting in the new mascot: Duncan, named the dunkin' daredevil.

History 
The product was discontinued in the United States in 2012 but continued to be sold in Canada. In 2016, General Mills announced a campaign called "Smugglaroos", which encouraged Canadians travelling to the United States to bring the snack to Americans who wanted it. Dunkaroos continued being sold in Canada until January 2018, with no comment by General Mills. In December 2019 Dunkaroos were brought back unofficially by Nestlé with a chocolate-hazelnut flavour. The biscuits are shaped like a kangaroo biscuit.
This is only available in Australia as Nestlé does not have the right to sell Dunkaroos worldwide.

On February 3, 2020, a BuzzFeed article was published claiming that General Mills sent them exclusive info regarding a return of Dunkaroos. The official Twitter account for Dunkaroos claimed that they were scheduled to be re-released during the summer of 2020. It also used to link to the BuzzFeed article in the bio, but this was later changed to their official website.

In May 2020, Dunkaroos began arriving at 7-Eleven stores in the United States until being brought to other stores, including Walmart, Target, and Kroger, a few months afterwards. The new single serving package went from 1oz to 1.5oz, and the sugar was reduced significantly.

On July 22, 2020, limited edition merchandise based on the brand was released, with each order coming with a pack of the aforementioned snack.

On November 23, 2020, limited edition Dunkaroos cookie dough, complete with frosting, was released.

Around early January 2021, a Dunkaroos cereal was released by General Mills.

Around January 2021, Dunkaroos yogurt was released under Yoplait's Go-Gurt product line.

In 2022, a new, limited-time only orange sherbet flavor was released, alongside a variant with chocolate cookies and chocolate chip frosting.

Varieties 

Dunkaroos come in rainbow sprinkle frosting with vanilla cookies, vanilla frosting with chocolate cookies, chocolate frosting with graham cookies, strawberry frosting with vanilla cookies, and rainbow sprinkle frosting with chocolate chip graham cookies.

Cookie dough, a cereal, yogurt, pancake mix, and a separate frosting pack also spawned from the 2020 version.
 
Previously the cookies were cinnamon flavored. There was a special SpongeBob SquarePants edition, featuring yellow frosting. The cookies also collaborated with DreamWorks in 2010 to add varieties based on their movies, like Megamind and Shark Tale.

References

External links

 Dunkaroos Twitter
 Official Website

Products introduced in 1990
Products and services discontinued in 2012
Products introduced in 2020
General Mills brands
Brand name cookies
Fictional kangaroos and wallabies
Cartoon mascots
Historical foods in American cuisine